Worthless Woman (French:Fille de rien) is a 1921 French silent film directed by André Hugon and starring Suzanne Talba, José Durany and Vasseur.

Cast
 Suzanne Talba as Conchita  
 José Durany as Pedro  
 Vasseur as Manuel  
 Maxa

References

Bibliography
 Rège, Philippe. Encyclopedia of French Film Directors, Volume 1. Scarecrow Press, 2009.

External links
 

1921 films
Films directed by André Hugon
French silent feature films
French black-and-white films
1920s French films